Aspelund is a Norwegian, Finnish, and also a rare Swedish-language surname. Notable people with the surname include:

Ami Aspelund (born 1953), Finnish singer
Helge Aspelund, Finnish chemist
Monica Aspelund (born 1946), Finnish singer

References

Norwegian-language surnames
Swedish-language surnames